The 1919–20 season was the 11th in the history of the Isthmian League, an English football competition.

Casuals, Civil Service and Tufnell Park were newly admitted, while four other clubs returned to the league after missing the short 1919 season. Dulwich Hamlet were champions, winning their first Isthmian League title.

League table

References

Isthmian League seasons
I